The Port of Midia is located on the Black Sea coastline, approx 13.5 NM north of Constanța.

It is one of the satellite ports of Constanța and was designed and built to serve the adjacent industrial and petrochemical facilities.

The north and south breakwaters have a total length of 6,97 km. The port covers 834 ha of which 234 ha is land and 600 ha is water. There are 14 berths (11 operational berths, 3 berths belong to the Constanța Shipyard) with a total length of 2,24 km.

The Port of Midia is mainly used for the supply of crude oil for the nearby Petromidia Refinery.

See also
Poarta Albă–Midia Năvodari Canal

References

Ports and harbours of Romania